Goiabada (from goiaba, guava] is a conserve made of red guavas and sugar, commonly found throughout the Portuguese-speaking countries of the world. It dates back to the colonial times of Brazil, where guavas were used as a substitute for the quinces used to make marmelada (quince cheese). An abundance of sugar and slave labour were crucial for its confection, in large cauldrons cooking over a slow fire. In rural areas of Brazil, it is still commonly made at home for family use or by home industry outlets (traditional recipes) or as processed food. It is a deep slightly bluish red colour, sometimes a very dark hue of red.

Very similar to goiabada is the closely related Colombian bocadillo, also made from guava but with more sugar.

It is known as guava paste or guava cheese throughout the English-speaking Americas, especially the Caribbean, and dulce de guayaba, barra de guayaba, pasta de guayaba, bocadillo or guayabate in Spanish-speaking Americas. It is commercially available, most often packaged in flat metal cans, or as long rectangular blocks in chipboard boxes. It is called perad in Goa (India), a former Portuguese colony.

In Brazil, goiabada is often eaten with Minas cheese. This combination is referred to as "Romeo and Juliet." It is also popular spread on toast at breakfast. In Portugal, it is used as the filling of the popular bolo de rosas (rose cake) in which a layer of pastry is covered with goiabada, then rolled and cut into pieces that resemble roses. This same cake is called rocambole in Brazil, and also uses a layer of pastry covered with goiabada, then rolled and served, as a Swiss roll. Another popular dessert is the bolo de rolo.

Goiabada may come in many widely different possible textures, ranging from a thin paste, meant to be eaten with a spoon or spread on bread or cakes, to very hard slabs that can be sliced with a knife only with some difficulty. Canned varieties are usually half-way between those extremes, being easily cut into soft slices. The many different kinds of goiabada depend on the type of guava, the proportion of sugar, the amount of water, and the cooking process.

See also

References
 Tropical and Subtropical Fruits: Postharvest Physiology, Processing and Packaging. Muhammad Siddiq. ed. John Wiley & Sons, Aug 7, 2012

Brazilian desserts
Portuguese desserts
Food paste
Guava dishes